Tuura-Suu is a village in the Issyk-Kul Region of Kyrgyzstan. It is part of the Ulakol rural community within the Tong District. Its population was 868 in 2021.

References

Populated places in Issyk-Kul Region